National Assembly Building may refer to:

 National Assembly Building of Belize
 Bulgaria National Assembly Building
 National Assembly Building (Beijing)
 Korea National Assembly Building
 Kuwait National Assembly Building
 National Assembly Building, Ljubljana, Slovenian National Assembly Building
 National Assembly Building, Yerevan, Armenian National Assembly Building